Tuscany Estates is a southeastern suburb of Auckland, New Zealand. It is located slightly southeast of the suburb Flat Bush. Tuscany Heights Reserve is located in Tuscany Estate.

Demographics 
Tuscany Estate had a population of 1,443 at the 2018 New Zealand census. There were 417 households. There were 726 males and 717 females, giving a sex ratio of 1.01 males per female, with 16.85% aged under 15 years, 22.65% aged 15 – 29 years, 48.05% aged 30 – 64 years, 12.05% aged over 65 or older.

Ethnicities were 52.0% European/Pākehā, 5.2% Māori, 3.7% Pacific peoples, 44.9% Asian and 1.0% other (totals add to more than 100% since people could identify with multiple ethnicities).

Although some people objected to giving their religion, 35.3% had no religion, 37.2% were Christian, and 6.9% had other religions.

Of those at least 15 years old or above, 20.9% people had a bachelor or higher degree, and 9.1% people had no formal qualifications. The employment status of those at least 15 or above was that 52.4% of people were employed full-time, 12.5% were part-time, and 2.8% were unemployed.

References 

Suburbs of Auckland